Guyang County (Mongolian:   Güyaŋ siyan) is a county in western Inner Mongolia, People's Republic of China.

Climate

References

www.xzqh.org 

County-level divisions of Inner Mongolia